"Drowning" is the first single from Crazy Town's second album, Darkhorse, and fifth released single in total. The song was written by Crazy Town and peaked at No. 24 on the Billboard Modern Rock Tracks and No. 50 in the UK.

Music video
The music video was directed by The Malloys. It features Crazy Town playing in an industrial area intercut with footage showing a story unfold. A young man befriends a girl at a lookout before she is dragged off by an aggressive male. Later the young man sees the girl at a party, and walks off with her alone. As he kisses her on the cheek, the aggressive male and his friends approach and beat the man whilst the girl protests. Distraught, the young man returns to the party, where he explains what happened to his friends. His friends get in a car and start searching for the attackers, eventually finding them at a restaurant. The attackers flee, and his friends chase them down one by one and beat them. The video ends with the distressed young man repeatedly punching something. When the camera angle changes it is shown that he has been on his knees punching at the ground; his friends are then seen helping him up.

Track listing
 Australia Maxi-single 

 UK Maxi-single 

 Germany Maxi-single

Charts

References

2002 singles
Crazy Town songs
Columbia Records singles
Music videos directed by The Malloys
2002 songs
Song recordings produced by Howard Benson